Four-Mod (โฟร์-มด) is a Thai pop duo consisting of two girls, Four and Mod, who formed in 2005.

In 2005, Four Mod released their debut single/song "Hai Jai Pen Tur".

Members 
 "Four" (Sakolrat Woraurai) (ศกลรัตน์ วรอุไร) She graduated with a bachelor's degree from Ramkhamhaeng
 "Mod" (Napapat Wattanakamolwut) (ณปภัช วัฒนากมลวุฒิ) She graduated from Bangkok University

Discography

Albums 
 (2005) Four-Mod
 (2006) LOVE LOVE
 (2007) Wooo!
 (2008) In Wonderland
 (2008) Go! Go!
 (2009) We Will Love U
 (2010) Hello Four-Mod
 (2012) I AM FOUR MOD
 (2013) CLUB FM

References

Thai pop music groups
Musical groups from Bangkok
Thai musical duos
Pop music duos
Female musical duos